Hatice Mahfiruz Hatun or Mahfiruze Hatun (Ottoman Turkish: ماه فروز خاتون, "Glorious moon" or "Daytime moon" or "Turquoise Moon";  1590 - before 1618) was a consort of Ottoman Sultan Ahmed I (r. 1603–17) and the mother of Osman II (r. 1618–22).

Biography
Due to the preeminence of Kösem Sultan during Ahmed's reign, there aren't many records about her life. She was a concubine, who may have been of Circassian origin.  She was Ahmed's first concubine, and on 3 November 1604 she gave birth to Ahmed's firstborn, the future Osman II, making Ahmed I the youngest Ottoman sultan to have fathered a child.

Despite this, she was not given the title of Haseki Sultan, which instead was given to Kösem, the most beloved consort and mother of Ahmed's second son, Şehzade Mehmed, and at least three other sons and three daughters, which deprived Mahfiruz of all power. However, she received the title of Başkadin (mother of the first-male born).

She disappears from the harem records shortly after Osman was born. While it was initially believed that she was disgraced and exiled, it is now believed that she died between 1608 and 1613, maybe in childbirth, and therefore was never her son's Valide Sultan, who ascended the throne in 1618. 

Indeed, records indicate that, during Osman's reign, she was not in any of the Imperial Palaces, not even in the provinces, and that the duties and salary of the Valide Sultan were instead attributed to Osman's governess, the Daye Hatun.

Mahfiruze was buried in the Ëyup cemetery, in a mausoleum built around 1610, which reinforces the theory that she died prematurely.

Issue
By Ahmed I, Mahfiruze had only one known child, the Sultan's firstborn and first son:
Osman II (3 November 1604, Istanbul, Topkapı Palace – murdered during a janissary revolt on 20 May 1622, Istanbul, Topkapı Palace, buried in the Ahmed I Mausoleum, Sultan Ahmed Mosque).  16th Sultan of the Ottoman Empire.
In addition to Osman, many historians speculate that she may have had a second child with Ahmed, even if they disagree on the identity of this one and don't exist a certain proof for this.

So, Mahfiruze may also have been the mother of one between:
Gevherhan Sultan (b. 1605 or 1608, generally believed to be a daughter of Kösem Sultan). 
Hatice Sultan (born in 1608, died in 1610; unknown motherhood).
Şehzade Süleyman (born in 1613, generally believed to be a son of Kösem Sultan).
Şehzade Bayezid (born in December 1612, unknown motherhood).
Şehzade Hüseyin (born on 14 December 1613, unknown motherhood).

In popular culture
In the 2015 Turkish television series Muhteşem Yüzyıl: Kösem, Mahfiruze was portrayed by actress Ceyda Olguner. Historical advisors to the series noted that Mahfiruze was a Circassian by birth. In the fifth episode of the first series, the character was recast with actress Dilara Aksüyek and introduced as "Çerkes güzeli Raşa" (Circassian beauty Rasha) before being renamed to Mahfiruze.

See also
List of mothers of the Ottoman sultans
List of consorts of the Ottoman sultans

Annotations

References

Sources

16th-century births
1620 deaths
17th-century consorts of Ottoman sultans
Slaves from the Ottoman Empire
Valide sultan
17th-century slaves
Burials at Eyüp Cemetery